This is a list of chemists. It should include those who have been important to the development or practice of chemistry. Their research or application has made significant contributions in the area of basic or applied chemistry.



A

Richard Abegg (1869–1910), German chemist
Frederick Abel (1827–1902), English chemist
Friedrich Accum (1769–1838), German chemist, advances in the field of gas lighting
Homer Burton Adkins (1892–1949), American chemist, known for work in hydrogenation of organic compounds
Peter Agre (born 1949), American chemist and doctor, 2003 Nobel Prize in Chemistry
Georgius Agricola (1494–1555), German scholar known as "the father of mineralogy"
Natalie Ahn, American chemist
Arthur Aikin (1773–1855), English chemist and mineralogist
Adrien Albert (1907–1989), Australian medicinal chemist
John Albery (1936–2013), English physical chemist
Kurt Alder (1902–1958), German chemist, 1950 Nobel Prize in Chemistry
Jerome Alexander (1876–1959), American expert on the chemistry of colloids
Elmer Lucille Allen (born 1931), American chemist and ceramic artist
Heather C. Allen (born 1960), American chemist
Adah Almutairi (born 1976), American chemist
Sidney Altman (1939–2022), 1989 Nobel Prize in Chemistry
Faiza Al-Kharafi (born 1946), Kuwaiti chemist, academic and the first woman to head a major university in the Middle East
Lisa Alvarez-Cohen, American chemist
Gloria Long Anderson (born 1938), American chemist
Christian B. Anfinsen (1916–1995), 1972 Nobel Prize in Chemistry
Angelo Angeli (1864–1931), Italian chemist
Octavio Augusto Ceva Antunes, Brazilian chemist
Anthony Joseph Arduengo, III (born 1952), American chemist
Johan August Arfwedson (1792–1841), Swedish chemist
Anton Eduard van Arkel (1893–1976), Dutch chemist
Svante Arrhenius (1859–1927), Swedish chemist, one of the founders of physical chemistry
Valerie Ashby (born 1965/1966), American chemist
Barbara Askins (born 1939), American chemist
Larned B. Asprey (1919–2005), American nuclear chemist
Alán Aspuru-Guzik (born 1976), computational chemist 
Francis William Aston (1877–1945), 1922 Nobel Prize in Chemistry
Karin Aurivillius (1920–1982), Swedish chemist and crystallographer
Amedeo Avogadro (1776–1856), Italian chemist and physicist, discovered Avogadro's law

B

Stephen Moulton Babcock (1843–1931), worked on the "single-grain experiment"
Myrtle Bachelder (1908–1997), American chemist noted for work on the Manhattan Project atomic bomb
Werner Emmanuel Bachmann (1901–1951), American chemist, known for work in steroids and RDX
Simone Badal-McCreath, Jamaican chemist
Leo Baekeland (1863–1944), Belgian-American chemist
Adolf von Baeyer (1835–1917), German chemist, 1905 Nobel Prize in Chemistry, synthesis of indigo
Piero Baglioni (born 1952), Italian chemist
Hendrik Willem Bakhuis Roozeboom (1854–1907), Dutch chemist
Alice Ball (1892–1916), African American chemist known for inventing an effective injectable treatment for leprosy
Emily Balskus (born 1980), American chemist and microbiologist
Zhenan Bao (born 1970), Chinese chemist known for developing technologies with organic field-effect transistors and organic semiconductors
Phil S. Baran (born 1977), American chemist known for synthesis, novel reactions and reagents
Coral Barbas, Spanish chemist
Allen J. Bard (born 1933), 2008 Wolf Prize in Chemistry
Vincenzo Barone (born 1952), Italian chemist
Neil Bartlett (1932–2008), English/Canadian/American chemist
Sir Derek Barton (1918–1998), 1969 Nobel Prize in Chemistry
Fred Basolo (1920–2007), American inorganic chemist
Esther Batchelder (1897–1987), American chemist, educator and specialist in nutrition
Antoine Baumé (1728–1804), French chemist
Karl Bayer (1847–1904), Austrian chemist
Johann Joachim Becher (1635–1682), German who developed the phlogiston theory of combustion
Kathryn Beers, American polymer chemist
Friedrich Konrad Beilstein (1838–1906), German-Russian chemist, created Beilstein database
Joseph Achille Le Bel (1847–1930), French chemist, early work in stereochemistry
Angela Belcher, American chemist, materials scientist, and biological engineer
Irina Beletskaya (born 1933), Russian organometallic chemist
R. P. Bell (1907–1996), English physical chemist
Francesco Bellini (born 1947), research scientist, doctor in organic chemistry
Andrey Belozersky (1905-1972), biochemist, doctor in biological sciences
Ruth R. Benerito (1916–2013), American chemist known for inventions relating to textiles
Paul Berg (1926–2023), 1980 Nobel Prize in Chemistry
Friedrich Bergius (1884–1949), 1931 Nobel Prize in Chemistry
Helen M. Berman (born 1943), American chemist
Marcellin Berthelot (1827–1907), French chemist, important work in thermochemistry
Claude Louis Berthollet (1748–1822), French chemist
Carolyn R. Bertozzi (born 1966) American chemist, Stanford
Guy Bertrand (born 1952) French chemist, UCSD
Jöns Jakob Berzelius (1779–1848), Swedish chemist, coined the term "polymer" in 1833
Johannes Martin Bijvoet (1892–1980), Dutch chemist and crystallographer
Leonora Bilger (1893–1975), American chemist who studied nitrogenous compounds
Hazel Bishop (1906–1998), American chemist and cosmetics inventor
Katherine Bitting (1869–1937), Canadian and American food chemist for the United States Department of Agriculture and the National Canners Association
Joseph Black (1728–1799), Scottish chemist
Katharine Burr Blodgett (1898–1979), American surface chemist and physicist and inventor of nonreflective glass
Suzanne Blum (born 1978), American chemist
Katharine Blunt (1876–1954), American chemist and nutritionist focusing on home economics, food chemistry and nutrition
 Herman Boerhaave (1668–1738) Dutch chemist, botanist, Christian humanist & physician, first to isolate urea from urine
Kristie Boering (born 1963), American chemist and Earth and planetary scientist
Dale L. Boger (born 1953), American organic and medicinal chemist
Paul Emile Lecoq de Boisbaudran (1838–1912), French chemist
Jan Boldingh (1915–2003), Dutch chemist
Alexander Borodin (1833–1887), Russian chemist and composer
Hans-Joachim Born (1909–1987), German radiochemist
Carl Bosch (1872–1940), German chemist
Octave Leopold Boudouard (1872–1923), French chemist who discovered the Boudouard reaction
Jean-Baptiste Boussingault (1802–1887), French chemist, agricultural chemistry
E. J. Bowen (1898–1980), English physical chemist
Humphry Bowen (1929–2001), English analytical chemist
Paul D. Boyer (1918–2018), 1997 Nobel Prize in Chemistry
Robert Boyer (1909–1989), employee of Henry Ford focus on soybean use.
Robert Boyle (1627–1691), Irish-English pioneer of modern chemistry
Henri Braconnot (1780–1855), French chemist and pharmacist
Henning Brand (c. 1630–c.1692 or c. 1710), German chemist, discovered phosphorus
Mary Bidwell Breed (1870–1949), American chemist focusing on aromatic acids, first woman dean of Indiana University
Ronald Breslow (1931–2017), American organic chemist
Alan Brisdon, British Chemist
Johannes Nicolaus Brønsted (1879–1947), Danish chemist
Herbert C. Brown (1912–2004), 1979 Nobel Prize in Chemistry
Jeannette Brown (born 1934), American organic medicinal chemist, historian, and author
Jeanette Grasselli Brown (born 1928), American analytical chemist and spectroscopist
Rachel Fuller Brown (1898–1980), American chemist who co-developed the first useful antifungal antibiotic
Eduard Buchner (1860–1917), 1907 Nobel Prize in Chemistry
Stephen L. Buchwald (born 1955), American Chemist, Organic Chemistry, co-discoverer of Palladium-catalyzed C-N bond formation Buchwald–Hartwig amination
Mary Van Rensselaer Buell (1893–1969), American chemist who did early research in nutrition and physiological chemistry
Kathryn Bullock (born 1945), American chemist who co-developed valve-regulated lead-acid batteries
Robert Wilhelm Bunsen (1811–1899), German inventor, chemist, discovered the elements caesium and rubidium with Gustav Kirchhoff and invented the Bunsen burner
Jeanne Burbank (1915–2002), American chemist who developed lead-acid and silver-zinc batteries for submarines at the United States Naval Research Laboratory
Stephanie Burns (born 1955), American organosilicon chemist and past honorary president of Society of Chemical Industry
William Merriam Burton (1865–1954), American chemist, developed the first thermal cracking process for crude oil
Adolf Butenandt (1903–1995), 1939 Nobel Prize in Chemistry
Alison Butler, American bioinorganic chemist and metallobiochemist
Aleksandr Butlerov (1828–1886), Russian chemist, discovered the formose reaction

C

Mary Letitia Caldwell (1890–1972), American chemist who developed a method for purifying crystalline porcine pancreatic amylase
Melvin Calvin (1911–1997), American chemist, winner of 1961 Nobel Prize in Chemistry
Allison A. Campbell (born 1963), American chemist studying biomineralization, biomimetics and biomaterials
Constantin Cândea (1887–1971), Romanian chemist
Stanislao Cannizzaro (1826–1910), Italian chemist, postulated the Cannizzaro reaction
Georg Ludwig Carius (1829–1875), German chemist
Heinrich Caro (1834–1910), German chemist
Wallace Carothers (1896–1937), American chemist, known for the discovery of nylon
Emma P. Carr (1880–1972), American spectroscopist
Marjorie Constance Caserio (1929–2021), American chemist, winner of the American Chemical Society's Garvan Medal
Marta Catellani, Italian chemist, discovered the Catellani reaction
Henry Cavendish (1731–1810), British scientist
Elena Ceaușescu (1916–1989), Romanian communist politician 
Thomas Cech (born 1947), 1989 Nobel Prize in Chemistry
Martin Chalfie (born 1947), 2008 Nobel Prize in Chemistry
Michelle Chang (born 1977), American chemist, Professor of Chemistry, University of California, Berkeley
Yves Chauvin (1930–2015), 2005 Nobel Prize in Chemistry
Michel Eugėne Chevreul (1786–1889), French chemist, designed an early form of soap, lived to be 102
Christine S. Chow, American chemist
Aaron Ciechanover (born 1947), 2004 Nobel Prize in Chemistry
Giacomo Luigi Ciamician (1857–1922) Italian chemist, father of the solar panel
G. Marius Clore FRS (born 1955), American chemist, known for foundational work in three-dimensional protein and nucleic acid structure determination by nuclear magnetic resonance spectroscopy
Edward L. Cochran (born 1929), American chemist, known for pioneering studies on the nature of free radicals
Ernst Cohen (1869–1944), Dutch chemist (murdered in Auschwitz)
Mildred Cohn (1913–2009), American chemist who studied chemical reactions within animal cells
David Collison, British chemist
Vicki Colvin (born 1965), Director of the Centre for Biomedical Engineering at Brown University
James Bryant Conant (1893–1978), American organic chemist, Priestley Medal 1944
Elias James Corey (born 1928), American organic chemist, winner of the 1990 Nobel Prize in Chemistry
Robert Corey (1897–1971), American biochemist
Carl Ferdinand Cori (1896–1984), Czech biochemist, Nobel Prize in medicine 1947
Gerty Cori (1896–1957), American biochemist, Nobel Prize in medicine 1947
Charles D. Coryell (1912–1971), American chemist, co-discovered the element promethium
John Cornforth (1917–2013), Australian winner of the 1975 Nobel Prize in Chemistry
Brigid Cotter (1921–1978), Irish chemist and barrister
Frank Albert Cotton (1930–2007), 2000 Wolf Prize in Chemistry
Charles Coulson (1910–1974), British theoretical chemist
Archibald Scott Couper (1831–1892), English chemist, further developed Tetravalence
James Crafts (1839–1917), American chemist, developer of Friedel–Crafts reaction
Donald J. Cram (1919–2001), American chemist, winner of the 1987 Nobel Prize in Chemistry
William Crookes (1832–1919), British chemist, discovered the element thallium
Alexander Crum Brown (1838–1922), Scottish organic chemist
Paul J. Crutzen (1933–2021), Dutch chemist, winner of the 1995 Nobel Prize in Chemistry
Ana Maria Cuervo (born 1966), Spanish-American physician, researcher, and cell biologist
Marie Curie (1867–1934), Polish radiation physicist, 1903 Nobel Prize in Physics, 1911 Nobel Prize in Chemistry
Pierre Curie (1859–1906), 1903 Nobel Prize in Physics
Robert Curl (1933–2022), American chemist, winner of 1996 Nobel Prize in Chemistry
Theodor Curtius (1857–1928), German chemist
Emil Czyrniański (1824–1888), Polish chemist

D

Jeff Dahn (born 1957), American materials chemist noted for significant contributions to lithium-ion batteries
John Dalton (1766–1844), physicist and pioneer of the atomic theory
Marie Maynard Daly (1921–2003), American biochemist and the first African American woman in the United States to earn a PhD in chemistry
Carl Peter Henrik Dam (1895–1976), Danish biochemist, winner of the 1943 Nobel Prize in Physiology or Medicine
Vincenzo, Count Dandolo (1758–1819), Italian Nobleman and Chemist
Samuel J. Danishefsky (born 1936), American organic chemist, natural product Total synthesis, 1995/6 Wolf Prize in Chemistry
Humphry Davy (1778–1829), British chemist, discovered several alkaline earth metals
Raymond Davis, Jr. (1914–2006), American physical chemist
Serena DeBeer (born 1973, American chemist and director of the Max Planck Institute for Chemical Energy Conversion
Peter Debye (1884–1966), Dutch chemist, winner of the 1936 Nobel Prize in Chemistry
Johann Deisenhofer (born 1943), 1988 Nobel Prize in Chemistry
Margarita del Val (born 1959), Spanish chemist, immunologist, and virologist
Nathalie Demassieux (1884–1961), French mineral chemist and academic
James Dewar (1842–1923), British chemist and physicist
François Diederich (1952–2020), Luxembourg chemist
Otto Diels (1876–1954), German chemist, winner of the 1950 Nobel Prize in Chemistry
Robert Dirks (1978–2015), American computational chemist
Martha Doan (1872–1960), American chemist who studied thallium compounds
William von Eggers Doering (1917–2011), American chemist
Edward Doisy (1893– 1986), American biochemist, winner of the 1943 Nobel Prize in Physiology or Medicine
Davorin Dolar (1921–2005), chemist from University of Ljubljana
Vy Maria Dong (born 1976), American chemist who studies enantioselective catalysis and natural product synthesis
David Adriaan van Dorp (1915–1995), Dutch chemist
Israel Dostrovsky (1918–2010), Russian (Ukraine)-born Israeli physical chemist, fifth president of the Weizmann Institute of Science
Herbert Henry Dow (1866–1930), American industrial chemist, known for bromine extraction
Cornelius Drebbel (1572–1633), Dutch inventor, alchemist and chemist
Vratislav Ducháček (1941–2018), Czech chemist
Carl Duisberg (1861–1935), German chemist, early administrative industrial chemist
Jean Baptiste Dumas (1800–1884), French chemist, work on atomic weights
Helen Dyer (1895–1998), American biochemist and early cancer researcher

E

Sandra Eaton, American chemist notable for work on electron paramagnetic resonance
Eilaf Egap, American chemist
Paul Ehrlich (1854–1915), German chemist, winner of the 1908 Nobel Prize in Physiology or Medicine
Arthur Eichengrün (1867–1949), German chemist
Manfred Eigen (1927–2019), German chemist, winner of the 1967 Nobel Prize in Chemistry
Mostafa El-Sayed (born 1933), Egyptian-American physical chemist
Fausto Elhuyar (1755–1833), Spanish chemist, discoverer of tungsten
Lorne Elias, Canadian chemist, inventor of the explosives vapour detector EVD-1
Gertrude B. Elion (1918–1999), American biochemist and recipient of the 1988 Nobel Prize in Physiology or Medicine
Conrad Elvehjem (1901–1962), American biochemist, discovered niacin
Harry Julius Emeléus (1903–1993), British inorganic chemist
Gladys Anderson Emerson (1903–1984), American chemist and early nutritionist, and the first person to isolate Vitamin E
Emil Erlenmeyer (1825–1909), German chemist
Richard R. Ernst (1933–2021), 1991 Nobel Prize in Chemistry
Gerhard Ertl (born 1936), German physical chemist, 2007 Nobel prize in chemistry
Margaret C. Etter (1943–1992), American chemist and developer of solid state chemistry for crystalline organic compounds
Hans von Euler-Chelpin (1873–1964), Swedish chemist, winner of the 1929 Nobel Prize in Chemistry
Henry Eyring (1901–1981), Mexican-American theoretical chemist

F

Kazimierz Fajans (1887–1975), Polish-American physical chemist
Michael Faraday (1791–1867), chemist and physicist, discovered Benzene
Hermann von Fehling (1812–1885), German chemist
John Bennett Fenn (1917–2010), 2002 Nobel Prize in Chemistry
Enrico Fermi (1901–1954), Nuclear Chemist and Elementary Particle Physicist, Nobel Prize in Physics 1938
Mary Peters Fieser (1909–1997), American chemist and author of chemistry books
Barbara J. Finlayson-Pitts, Canadian-American atmospheric chemist
Hermann Emil Fischer (1852–1919), 1902 Nobel Prize in Chemistry, (actual name Hermann Emil Fischer, see below) not to be confused with:
Franz Joseph Emil Fischer (1877–1947), German chemist, co-discovered the Fischer–Tropsch process
Emily V. Fischer (born 1979/1980), American chemist notable for work on the WE-CAN project and on peroxyacetyl nitrate
Ernst Gottfried Fischer (1754–1831), German chemist
Ernst Otto Fischer (1918–2007), German chemist, 1973 Nobel Prize in Chemistry winner
Hans Fischer (1881–1945), German organic chemist, 1930 Nobel Prize in Chemistry winner
Nellie Ivy Fisher (1907–1995), London-born industrial chemist 
Wilhelm Rudolph Fittig (1835–1910), German chemist, co-discovered Wurtz–Fittig reaction
Edith M. Flanigen (born 1929), American chemist known for synthesizing emeralds and zeolites
Antoine François, comte de Fourcroy (1775–1809), co-discovered the element Iridium and developed modern chemical notation
Nicolas Flamel (c. 1330–1418), French alchemist
Paul Flory (1910–1985), 1974 Nobel Prize in Chemistry
Maria Forsyth, Australian researcher, new plastic materials for batteries
Margaret D. Foster (1895–1970), Manhattan Project chemist and the first female chemist to work for the United States Geological Survey
Joanna Fowler (born 1942), American neural chemist
Michelle Francl, American computational chemist
Edward Frankland (1825–1899), English chemist, originated the concept of valence
Rosalind Franklin (1920–1958), British Chemist and Crystallographer
Katherine Franz (born 1972), American chemist noted for work in metal ion coordination in biological systems
Herman Frasch (1851–1914), German mining engineer and inventor, pioneered the Frasch process
Bertram Fraser-Reid (1934 –  2020), Jamaican synthetic organic chemist who developed the armed-disarmed principle in glycosylation chemistry. He constructed the largest ever synthetic hetero-oligosaccharide without the use of automated methods.
Helen Murray Free (1923–2021), American chemist who developed self-testing systems for diabetes
Carl Remigius Fresenius (1818–1897), German chemist
Ida Freund (1863–1914), first woman to be a university chemistry lecturer in the UK
Charles Friedel (1832–1899), French chemist, developer of Friedel–Crafts reaction
Alexander Naumovich Frumkin (1895–1976), electrochemist and chemist
Kenichi Fukui (1918–1998), 1981 Nobel Prize in Chemistry
Elizabeth Fulhame (18th–19th centuries), British chemist, pioneer in the study of catalysis
Vera Furness (1921–2002), English chemist and industrial manager

G

Johan Gadolin (1760–1852), Finnish chemist
Merrill Garnett (born 1930), American biochemist
Joseph Louis Gay-Lussac (1778–1850), French chemist and physicist, discovered the Gay-Lussac law
Charles Frédéric Gerhardt (1816–1856), French chemist, synthesized acetylsalicylic acid
William Giauque (1895–1982), 1949 Nobel Prize in Chemistry
Josiah Willard Gibbs (1839–1903), American engineer, chemist and physicist
Walter Gilbert (born 1932), 1980 Nobel Prize in Chemistry
Henry Gilman (1893–1986), American chemist, discovered the Gilman reagent
Judith Giordan, American chemist and professor; 2014 American Chemical Society Henry Whalen Award
Johann Rudolf Glauber (1604–1670), Dutch-German alchemist and chemist
Lawrence E. Glendenin (1918–2008), American chemist, co-discovered the element promethium
Leopold Gmelin (1788–1853), German chemist, discovered potassium ferricyanide
Theodore Nicolas Gobley (1811–1874), French chemist, pioneer in brain tissues analysis, discoverer of lecithin
Adolph Goetting (1851–1929), German chemist, worked for California Perfume Company
Sulamith Goldhaber (1923–1965), Austrian-American chemist, high-energy physicist, and molecular spectroscopist
Victor Goldschmidt (1888–1947), father of modern geochemistry
Moses Gomberg (1866–1947), Russian-American chemist, known for pioneering work in radical chemistry
Mary L. Good (1931–2019), American inorganic chemist
David van Goorle also called Gorlaeus (1591–1612), Dutch chemist, one of the first modern atomists
Loney Gordon (1915–1999), American chemist who assisted in creating the pertussis vaccine
Carl Gräbe (1841–1927), German chemist, discovered the dye alizarin
Thomas Graham (1805–1869), Scottish chemist, dialysis and diffusion
Harry B. Gray (born 1935), 2004 Wolf Prize in Chemistry
Martha Greenblatt (born 1941), American solid state inorganic chemist, 2003 American Chemical Society's Garvan-Olin Medal
Bettye Washington Greene (1935–1995), American researcher on latex and polymers
Sandra C. Greer (born 1945) American chemist notable for work on thermodynamics of fluids, polymer solutions and phase transitions
François Auguste Victor Grignard (1871–1935), 1912 Nobel Prize in Chemistry corecipient
Robert H. Grubbs (1942–2021), 2005 Nobel Prize in Chemistry

H

Fritz Haber (1868–1934), German chemist, 1918 Nobel Prize in Chemistry, father of the Haber process
Dorothy Hahn (1876–1950), early American organic chemist and ultraviolet spectroscopist
Otto Hahn (1879–1968), German chemist, discoverer of nuclear fission, 1944 Nobel Prize in Chemistry, father of nuclear chemistry
Sossina M. Haile (born 1966), American chemist notable for developing the first solid acid fuel cells
Naomi Halas, American biochemist focusing on nanoshells and nanophotonics
John Burdon Sanderson Haldane (1892–1962), British and Indian biochemist, geneticist and evolutionary biologist
John Scott Haldane (1860–1936), British biochemist
Charles Martin Hall (1863–1914), American chemist, famous for Hall-Héroult process
Frances Mary Hamer (1894–1980), British chemist who specialized in photographic sensitization compounds
George S. Hammond (1921–2005), American chemist, famous for Hammond's postulate
Arthur Harden (1865–1940), English biochemist and winner of the shared Nobel Prize in Chemistry in 1929
Elizabeth Hardy (1915–2008), American chemist and discoverer of the Cope rearrangement
Anna J. Harrison (1912–1998), first female President of the American Chemical Society
Odd Hassel (1897–1981), Norwegian chemist 1969 Nobel Prize in chemistry
Charles Hatchett (1765–1847), English chemist who discovered niobium
Herbert A. Hauptman (1917–2011), 1985 Nobel Prize in chemistry
Robert Havemann (1910–1982), chemist
Walter Hawkins (1911–1992), African American chemist, widely regarded as a pioneer of polymer chemistry. Co-invented a polymer with antioxidants that prevented deterioration even in extreme temperatures. 
Walter Haworth (1883–1950), 1937 Nobel Prize in chemistry
Sam Hay, New Zealand chemist
Alma Levant Hayden (1927–1967), American spectrophotometer at the National Institutes of Health
Jabir Ibn Hayyan (722–804), Persian-Arab chemist and alchemist
Clayton Heathcock (born 1936), American chemist
Alan J. Heeger (born 1936), 2000 Nobel Prize in chemistry
Jan Baptist van Helmont (1579–1644), The founder of pneumatic chemistry
Dudley R. Herschbach (born 1932), American chemist, 1986 Nobel Prize in chemistry
Avram Hershko (born 1937), 2004 Nobel Prize in chemistry
Charles Herty (1867–1938), American chemist
Gerhard Herzberg (1904–1999), German-Canadian chemist, 1971 Nobel Prize in Chemistry
Germain Henri Hess (1802–1850), Swiss-born Russian chemist, namesake of Hess's Law
George de Hevesy (1885–1966), Hungarian born chemist, recipient of the Nobel Prize in chemistry 1943
Jaroslav Heyrovský (1890–1967), Czech chemist, 1959 Nobel Prize in Chemistry
Evelyn Hickmans (1883–1972), British biochemist, pioneer in treatment of phenylketonuria
Joel Hildebrand (18811983) American educator and chemist specializing in liquids and nonelectrolyte solutions
Mary Elliott Hill (1907–1969), American chemist who developed analytic methodology for ultraviolet light
Cyril Norman Hinshelwood (1897–1967), English physical chemist and winner of the shared Nobel Prize in Chemistry in 1956
Gladys Lounsbury Hobby (1910–1993), American microbiologist known for development and early understanding of antibiotics
Dorothy Hodgkin (1910–1994), 1964 Nobel Prize in chemistry
Jacobus Henricus van 't Hoff (1852–1911), Dutch physical chemist, 1901 Nobel Prize in Chemistry
Albert Hofmann (1906–2008), Swiss chemist, synthesized Lysergic acid diethylamide (LSD)
August Wilhelm Hofmann (1818–1892), German chemist, first to isolate sorbic acid
Darleane C. Hoffman (born 1926), American nuclear chemist
Friedrich Hoffmann (1660–1742), physician and chemist
Roald Hoffmann (born 1937), Polish-born American chemist, 1981 Nobel Prize in Chemistry
Mei Hong (born 1970), Chinese-American biophysical chemist
Frederick Gowland Hopkins (1861–1947), British biochemist, known for discovery of vitamins, Nobel Prize in Physiology or Medicine in 1929
Marjorie G. Horning (1917–2020), American biochemist and pioneer of chromatography
Linda Hsieh-Wilson, American chemist, California Institute of Technology
Heinrich Hubert Maria Josef Houben (1875–1940) German organic chemist
Coenraad Johannes van Houten (1801–1887), Dutch chemist and chocolate maker, invented cocoa powder
Amir H. Hoveyda, U.S.-based chemist working in asymmetric catalysis
Benjamin Hsiao (born 1958), Asian American chemist at Stony Brook University, Fellow of the American Physical Society, Fellow of the American Chemical Society, Fellow of the American Association for the Advancement of Science
Marcia Huber, American chemical engineer and 2005 Department of Commerce Bronze Medal winner
Robert Huber (born 1937), 1988 Nobel Prize in chemistry
Catherine T. Hunt (born 1955), American chemist, president American Chemical Society and Dow Chemical Company director

I

Sir Christopher Kelk Ingold (1893–1970), English chemist
Vladimir Ipatieff (1867–1952), Russian-American chemist, known for organic synthesis

J

Nancy B. Jackson (1956–2022), American chemist
Marilyn E. Jacox (1929–2013), American chemist and National Institute of Standards and Technology fellow
Hope Jahren (born 1969), American chemist and isotope analyst
Paul Janssen (1926–2003), Belgian founder of Janssen Pharmaceutica
Allene Jeanes (1906–1995), American chemist who developed Dextran to replace plasma in the Korean War
Frédéric Joliot-Curie (1900–1958), French chemist and physicist, 1935 Nobel Prize in Chemistry
Irène Joliot-Curie (1897–1956), French chemist and physicist, 1935 Nobel Prize in Chemistry
Madeleine M. Joullié (born 1927), French-American organic chemist and first woman to have an American tenure track position in organic chemistry
Percy Lavon Julian (1899–1975), African American organic chemist who was a pioneer in the chemical synthesis of medicinal drugs from plants. He was the first to synthesize the natural product physostigmine.

K

Henri B. Kagan (born 1930), 2001 Wolf Prize in Chemistry
Isabella Karle (1921–2017), American chemist instrumental for extracting plutonium chloride from a mixture containing plutonium oxide
Jerome Karle (1918–2013), 1985 Nobel Prize in Chemistry
Paul Karrer (1889–1971), 1937 Nobel Prize in Chemistry
Karl Wilhelm Gottlob Kastner (1783–1857)
Alan R. Katritzky (1928–2014) Pioneer in heterocyclic chemistry
Joyce Jacobson Kaufman (1929–2016), American chemist and inventor of conformational topology
Melinda H. Keefe, American chemist and research and development director at the Dow Chemical Company
August Kekulé (1829–1896), German organic chemist
Sinah Estelle Kelley (1916–1982), American chemist who helped pioneer mass production of penicillin
John Kendrew (1917–1997), 1962 Nobel Prize in Chemistry
Ann Kiessling (born 1942), American chemist and reproductive biologist
Petrus Jacobus Kipp (1808–1864), Dutch chemist, inventor of Kipp-generator
Johan Kjeldahl (1849–1900), Danish chemist, head chemist at Carlsberg Brewery, methods still in use
Martin Heinrich Klaproth (1743–1817), German chemist, discovered the element uranium
Trevor Kletz (1922–2013) British promoter of industrial safety
Aaron Klug (1926–2018), winner of the 1982 Nobel Prize in Chemistry
Emil Knoevenagel (1865–1921)
Jeremy Randall Knowles (1935–2008), British organic chemist
William Standish Knowles (1917–2012), 2001 Nobel Prize in Chemistry
Walter Kohn (1923–2016), 1998 Nobel Prize in Chemistry
Adolph Wilhelm Hermann Kolbe (1818–1884), German chemist known for Kolbe nitrile synthesis
Izaak Kolthoff (1894–1993), Dutch-American chemist, the "Father of Analytical Chemistry"
Roger D. Kornberg (born 1947), 2006 Nobel Prize in Chemistry
Hans A. Krebs (1900–1981), German biochemist, work on metabolic cycles
Harold Kroto (1939–2016), English chemist, 1996 Nobel Prize in Chemistry
Richard Kuhn (1900–1967), 1938 Nobel Prize in Chemistry
Eugenia Kumacheva, polymer chemist

L

Irving Langmuir (1881–1957), chemist, physicist, 1932 Nobel Prize in Chemistry
Auguste Laurent (1807–1853), French chemist, discovered anthracene
Paul Lauterbur (1929–2007), American chemist
Antoine Lavoisier (1743–1794), French pioneer chemist
Nicolas Leblanc (1742–1806), French chemist and surgeon
Henri Louis Le Chatelier (1850–1936)
Yuan T. Lee (born 1936), winner of 1986 Nobel Prize in Chemistry
Valery Legasov (1936–1988), Soviet inorganic chemist known for his position as head of the Chernobyl Commission for the Chernobyl Disaster
Jean-Marie Lehn (born 1939), French chemist, shared 1987 Nobel Prize in Chemistry
Luis Federico Leloir (1906–1987), Argentine biochemist and winner of the 1970 Nobel Prize in Chemistry
Raymond Lemieux (1920–2000), 1999 Wolf Prize in Chemistry
Gilbert Newton Lewis (1875–1946), American chemist and first Dean of the Berkeley College of Chemistry
Andreas Libavius (1555–1616), German doctor and chemist
Carl Theodore Liebermann (1842–1914), German chemist, known for synthesis of alizarin
Willard Libby (1908–1980), American chemist, winner of 1960 Nobel Prize in Chemistry
Justus von Liebig (1803–1873), German inventor and pioneer in agricultural and biological chemistry
Karl Paul Link (1901–1978), American biochemist, discovered the anticoagulant warfarin
John Wilfrid Linnett (1913–1975), British chemist at the Universities of Oxford and Cambridge.
William Lipscomb (1919–2011), 1976 Nobel Prize in Chemistry
Joseph Lister, 1st Baron Lister (1827–1912), English surgeon
Arthur H. Livermore (1915–2009), science educator and chemist
Mikhail Lomonosov (1711–1765), Russian scientist, anticipated the kinetic-molecular theory by 100 years
H. Christopher Longuet-Higgins (1923–2004), British chemist
Janis Louie, (born 1971) American chemist
Martin Lowry (1874–1936), British chemist
Sima Lozanić (1847–1935), Serbian chemist
Alfred Lucas (1867–1945), Egypt-based English chemist and archaeologist
Ignacy Łukasiewicz (1802–1882), Polish pharmacist

M

Alan MacDiarmid (1927–2007), 2000 Nobel Prize in Chemistry
Carolina Henriette Mac Gillavry (1904–1993), Dutch chemist and crystallographer
Roderick MacKinnon (born 1956), 2003 Nobel Prize in Chemistry
Pierre Macquer (1718–1784), influential French chemist
Rudolph A. Marcus (born 1923), 1992 Nobel Prize in Chemistry
Jacob A. Marinsky (1918–2005), American chemist, co-discovered the element promethium
Jean Charles Galissard de Marignac (1817–1894), Swiss chemist, discovered ytterbium and co-discovered gadolinium
Vladimir Vasilevich Markovnikov (1838–1904)
Tobin J. Marks (born 1944), American inorganic chemist and material scientist
Alan G. Marshall (born 1944), American chemist, co-inventor of Fourier transform ion cyclotron resonance (FT-ICR) mass spectrometry
Archer John Porter Martin (1910–2002), 1952 Nobel Prize in Chemistry
Martinus van Marum (1750–1837), Dutch chemist
Elmer McCollum (1879–1967), American biochemist, known for work of diet on health
Edwin McMillan (1907–1991), 1951 Nobel Prize in Chemistry
Lise Meitner (1878–1968), German physicist
Dmitri Ivanovich Mendeleev (1834–1907), Russian chemist, creator of the Periodic table of elements
John Mercer (1791–1866), chemist and industrialist
Robert Bruce Merrifield (1921–2006), solid-phase chemist, 1984 Nobel Prize in Chemistry
Julius Lothar Meyer (1830–1895), German chemist, important work on The periodic table of elements; not to be confused with:
Viktor Meyer (1848–1897)
 Dan Meyerstein (born 1938), Israeli chemist and president of Ariel University
August Michaelis (1847–1916), German chemist
Leonor Michaelis (1875–1949), German biochemist and physical chemist
Hartmut Michel (born 1948), 1988 Nobel Prize in Chemistry
Huang Minlon (1889–1979), Chinese chemist
Stanley Miller (1930–2007), American chemist, best known for the Miller–Urey experiment
Eugène Millon (1812–1867), French chemist
David P. Mills, British chemist
Luis E. Miramontes (1925–2004), co-inventor of the combined oral contraceptive pill
Peter D. Mitchell (1920–1992), 1978 Nobel Prize in Chemistry
William A. Mitchell (1911–2004), key inventor behind Pop Rocks, Tang, and Kool Whip
Eilhardt Mitscherlich (1794–1863) German chemist, remembered for the law of isomorphism.
Alexander Mitscherlich (1836–1918), chemist
Karl Friedrich Mohr (1806–1879), German chemist famous for first musings on the Conservation of energy
Henri Moissan (1852–1907), French chemist and the winner of the 1906 Nobel Prize in Chemistry
Mario J. Molina (1943–2020), 1995 Nobel Prize in Chemistry
Jacques Monod (1910–1976), biochemist, winner of Nobel Prize in Physiology or Medicine in 1965
Jeffrey S. Moore (born 1961), American material chemist
Peter Moore (born 1939), American biochemist, Sterling Professor of Chemistry at Yale University
Stanford Moore (1913–1982), 1972 Nobel Prize in Chemistry
Hamilton Morris (born 1987), American chemist, creator and director of the television series Hamilton's Pharmacopeia
Henry Gwyn Jeffreys Moseley (1887–1915), English physicist, discovered Moseley's law
Gerardus Johannes Mulder (1802–1880), Dutch organic chemist
Paul Müller (1899–1965), Swiss chemist, discovered DDT, won the Nobel Prize in Physiology or Medicine in 1939
Robert S. Mulliken (1896–1986), American physicist, chemist, 1966 Nobel Prize in Chemistry
Kary Mullis (1944–2019), 1993 Nobel Prize in Chemistry
Earl Muetterties (1927–1984), American chemist
Catherine J. Murphy (born 1964), American chemist and materials scientist

N

Robert Nalbandyan (1937–2002), Armenian protein chemist
Louise Natrajan, British chemist
Giulio Natta (1903–1979), Italian chemist, 1963 Nobel Prize in Chemistry
Costin Nenitescu (1902–1970), Romanian chemist
Antonio Neri (1576–1614), Florentine chemist and glassmaker
Walther Nernst (1864–1941), German chemist, 1920 Nobel Prize in Chemistry
John Alexander Reina Newlands (1837–1898), English analytical chemist
William Nicholson (1753–1815), English chemist
Kyriacos Costa Nicolaou (born 1946), Cypriot-American chemist
Julius Nieuwland (1878–1936), American chemist, work on synthetic rubber leading to neoprene
Mathias Nilsson, Swedish chemist
Alfred Nobel (1833–1896), Swedish chemist
Philiswa Nomngongo, South-African professor of Analytical Chemistry and the SARChI in nanotechnology for water
Ronald George Wreyford Norrish (1897–1978), 1967 Nobel Prize in Chemistry
John Howard Northrop (1891–1987), 1946 Nobel Prize in Chemistry
Ryōji Noyori (born 1938), 2001 Wolf Prize in Chemistry, 2001 Nobel Prize in Chemistry
Ralph Nuzzo (born 1954), American chemist and materials scientist

O

George Andrew Olah (1927–2017), 1994 Nobel Prize in Chemistry
Marilyn Olmstead (1943-2020) chemist, expert in small molecule crystallography
Fred Olsen (1891–1986), inventor of the ball propellant manufacturing process
Lars Onsager (1903–1976), physical chemist, 1968 Nobel Prize in Chemistry
Tony Orchard (1941–2005), British inorganic chemist, photoelectron spectroscopist
Joan Oró (1923–2004), Catalan biochemist, one of his most important contributions was the prebiotic synthesis of the nucleobase adenine from hydrogen cyanide
Hans Christian Ørsted (1777–1851), first to isolate aluminium
Wilhelm Ostwald (1853–1932), 1909 Nobel Prize in Chemistry
Larry E. Overman (born 1943), transition-metal catalysis in synthesis
Geoffrey Ozin (born 1943), materials chemist

P

Paracelsus (1493–1541), alchemist
Rudolph Pariser (born 1923), theoretical and organic chemist
Robert G. Parr (1921–2017), theoretical chemist
Louis Pasteur (1822–1895), French biochemist, father of pasteurization
Linus Pauling (1901–1994), Nobel Prizes in chemistry and peace
Charles J. Pedersen (1904–1989), 1987 Nobel Prize in Chemistry
Eugène-Melchior Péligot (1811–1890), French chemist who isolated the uranium metal
William Henry Perkin (1838–1907), British organic chemist and inventor of mauveine (dye)
William Henry Perkin, Jr. (1860–1929), British organic chemist, son of Sir William Henry Perkin
Max Perutz (1914–2002), 1962 Nobel Prize in Chemistry
Eva Philbin (1914–2005), Irish chemist
David Andrew Phoenix (born 1966), biochemist
Georgy Pigulevsky (1888-1964), Russian chemist and biochemist
Roy J. Plunkett (1910–1994), discoverer of Teflon
John Charles Polanyi (born 1929), Canadian chemist, Nobel Prize in Chemistry 1986
John A. Pople (1925–2004), theoretical chemist, 1998 Nobel Prize in Chemistry
Vera Vevstafievna Popova (1867–1896), one of the first female Russian chemists
George Porter (1920–2002), 1967 Nobel Prize in Chemistry
Fritz Pregl (1869–1930), Slovene-German chemist, Nobel Prize in Chemistry 1923
Vladimir Prelog (1906–1998), 1975 Nobel Prize in Chemistry
Joseph Priestley (1733–1804), no formal training as a scientist, discovered the element oxygen
Ilya Prigogine (1917–2003), 1977 Nobel Prize in Chemistry
Joseph Louis Proust (1754–1826), discovered the Law of definite proportions

R

Venkatraman Ramakrishnan (born 1952), 2009 Nobel Prize in Chemistry
William Ramsay (1852–1916), Scottish chemist, 1904 Nobel Prize in Chemistry
C. N. R. Rao (born 1934), Indian chemist
François-Marie Raoult (1830–1901), French chemist, known for Raoult's law
Henry Rapoport (1918–2002), American chemist, UC Berkeley
William Sage Rapson (1912–1999), South African chemist and co-author of Gold Usage
Ken Raymond (born 1942), American inorganic and bioinorganic chemist, UC Berkeley
Julius Rebek (born 1944), Hungarian American chemist
Charles Lee Reese (1862–1940), American chemist and Chemical Director of DuPont
Henri Victor Regnault (1810–1878), French chemist and physicist
Tadeus Reichstein (1897–1996), chemist, 1950 Nobel Prize in Physiology or Medicine
Rhazes (Razi) (865–925), Iranian chemist
Stuart A. Rice (born 1932), physical chemist
Ellen Swallow Richards (1842–1911), industrial and environmental chemist
Theodore William Richards (1868–1928), 1914 Nobel Prize in Chemistry
Wim Richter (1946–2019), South Africa
Jeremias Benjamin Richter (1762–1807), German chemist, first used the term stoichiometry
Nikolaus Riehl (1901–1990), German chemist
Andrés Manuel del Río (1764–1849), Spanish-Mexican geochemist, discovered vanadium
Robert Robinson (1886–1975), 1947 Nobel Prize in Chemistry
Pierre Jean Robiquet (1780–1840), French chemist, discovered caffeine, alizarin, cantharidin
Hillar Rootare (1928–2008), Estonian-American physical chemist
Irwin Rose (1926–2015), 2004 Nobel Prize in Chemistry
Guillaume-François Rouelle (1703–1770), French chemist
Hilaire-Marin Rouelle (1718–1779), French chemist
Frank Sherwood Rowland (1927–2012), 1995 Nobel Prize in Chemistry
Daniel Rutherford (1749–1819), Scottish chemist
Ernest Rutherford (1871–1937), New Zealand born chemist and nuclear physicist. Discovered the proton. Nobel Prize in Chemistry 1908
Leopold Ruzicka (Lavoslav Ružička) (1887–1976), 1939 Nobel Prize in Chemistry

S

Paul Sabatier (1854–1941), 1912 Nobel Prize in Chemistry corecipient

Frederick Sanger (1918–2013), 1958 and 1980 Nobel Prize in Chemistry
Carl Wilhelm Scheele (1742–1786), Swedish 18th century chemist, discovered numerous elements
Christian Friedrich Schönbein (1799–1868), German-Swiss chemist, invented the fuel cell, and discovered gun cotton and ozone
Stuart L. Schreiber (born 1956), American chemist, a pioneer in a field of chemical biology
Richard R. Schrock (born 1945), 2005 Nobel Prize in Chemistry
Peter Schultz (born 1956), American chemist
Glenn T. Seaborg (1912–1999), 1951 Nobel Prize in Chemistry
Nils Gabriel Sefström (1787–1845), chemist
Francesco Selmi (1817–1881), Italian chemist
Nikolay Nikolayevich Semyonov (1896–1986), physicist and chemist, 1956 Nobel Prize in Chemistry
K. Barry Sharpless (born 1941), 2001 Wolf Prize in Chemistry, 2001 Nobel Prize in Chemistry
Dan Shechtman (born 1941), 2011 Nobel Prize in Chemistry, discovered quasicrystals
Patsy O. Sherman (1930–2008), 12 US patents
John Sherwood (died 2020), British physical chemist
Nevil Vincent Sidgwick (1873–1952), English theoretical chemist, known for work in valency
Osamu Shimomura (1928–2018), 2008 Nobel Prize in Chemistry
Hideki Shirakawa (born 1936), 2000 Nobel Prize in Chemistry
Alexander Shulgin (1925–2014), pioneer researcher in Psychopharmacology and Entheogens
Salimuzzaman Siddiqui (1897–1994), Pakistani chemist, pioneer in natural products chemistry
Oktay Sinanoglu (1935–2015), Turkish chemist
Joseph H. Simons (1897–1983), U.S. chemist, discoverer of fluorocarbons, used in gaseous diffusion of Uranium for Manhattan project
Jens Christian Skou (1918–2018), 1997 Nobel Prize in Chemistry
Richard Smalley (1943–2005), 1996 Nobel Prize in Chemistry
Michael Smith (1932–2000), 1993 Nobel Prize in Chemistry
Ascanio Sobrero (1812–1888), Italian chemist, discoverer of nitroglycerin
Frederick Soddy (1877–1956), British chemist, 1921 Nobel Prize in Chemistry
Susan Solomon (born 1956), American atmospheric chemist
Ernest Solvay (1838–1922), Belgian chemist and industrialist
S.P.L. Sørensen (1868–1939), Danish chemist
Gabor A. Somorjai (born 1935), 1998 Wolf Prize in Chemistry
Georg Ernst Stahl (1659–1734), Important work on fermentation
Wendell Meredith Stanley (1904–1971), 1946 Nobel Prize in Chemistry
Jean Servais Stas (1813–1891), Belgian analytical chemist
Branko Stanovnik (born 1938), chemist
Hermann Staudinger (1881–1965), polymer chemist, 1953 Nobel Prize in Chemistry
Harry Steenbock (1886–1967), American biochemist, work on ultraviolet irradiation
William Howard Stein (1911–1980), 1972 Nobel Prize in Chemistry
Thomas A. Steitz (1940–2018), 2009 Nobel Prize in Chemistry
Douglas Stephan, Frustrated Lewis Pairs
Alfred Stock (1876–1946), German inorganic chemist, known for work in mercury poisoning
Fraser Stoddart (born 1942), Scottish chemist, a pioneer in the field of the mechanical bond
Molly Shoichet, award-winning Canadian biomedical engineer known for her work in tissue engineering. She is the only person to be a fellow of the three National Academies in Canada
F. Gordon A. Stone (1925–2011), British inorganic chemist
S. Donald Stookey (1915–2014), American glass and ceramic chemist
Gilbert Stork (1921–2017), 1995/6 Wolf Prize in Chemistry
Friedrich August Kekulé von Stradonitz (1829–1896), German organic chemist, principal founder of chemical structure
James B. Sumner (1887–1955), 1946 Nobel Prize in Chemistry
Kenneth S. Suslick (born 1952), professor at the University of Illinois at Urbana–Champaign, known for optoelectronic nose
Edwin Sutermeister (1876–1958), American chemist, known for its work on papermaking
Theodor Svedberg (1884–1971), 1926 Nobel Prize in Chemistry
Joseph Swan (1828–1914), English physicist, chemist and inventor
Frédéric Swarts (1866–1940), Belgian chemist, prepared the first chlorofluorocarbon compound
Richard Laurence Millington Synge (1914–1994), 1952 Nobel Prize in Chemistry

T

Koichi Tanaka (born 1959), 2002 Nobel Prize in Chemistry
Henry Taube (1915–2005), 1983 Nobel Prize in Chemistry
Louis Jacques Thénard (1777–1857), French chemist, discovered hydrogen peroxide and Thenard's Blue
Sir Harold Warris Thompson (1908–1983), English physical chemist
J. J. Thomson (1856–1940), British physicist, Known in chemistry for discovery of isotopes
T. Don Tilley (born 1954), organometallic chemist
Arne Tiselius (1902–1971), 1948 Nobel Prize in Chemistry
Max Tishler (1906–1989), 1970 Priestley Medal
Alexander R. Todd, Baron Todd (1907–1997), 1957 Nobel Prize in Chemistry
Evangelista Torricelli (1608–1647), Italian physicist and chemist who invented the barometer, pupil of Galileo
Roger Y. Tsien (1952–2016), 2008 Nobel Prize in Chemistry
Mikhail Tsvet (1872–1919), Russian botanist, known for adsorption chromatography
Kristy Turner, British chemist

U

Georges Urbain (1872–1938), French chemist, discovered the element lutetium
Harold Clayton Urey (1893–1981), 1934 Nobel Prize in Chemistry

V

Lauri Vaska (1925–2015), Estonian/American chemist
Louis Nicolas Vauquelin (1763–1829), Discovered the elements beryllium and chromium
Vincent du Vigneaud (1901–1978), 1955 Nobel Prize in Chemistry
Artturi Ilmari Virtanen (1895–1973), chemist, Nobel Prize laureate
Max Volmer, Germany (1885–1965)
Alessandro Volta (1745–1827), electrochemist, invented the voltaic cell

W

Johannes Diderik van der Waals (1837–1923)
Sir James Walker (1863–1935), Scottish physical chemist
John E. Walker (born 1941), 1997 Nobel Prize in Chemistry
Otto Wallach (1847–1931), German chemist, 1910 Nobel Prize in Chemistry
John Warner (born 1962), American chemist, 2014 Perkin Medal, one of the "founders" of green chemistry
Alfred Werner (1866–1919), Swiss chemist, 1913 Nobel Prize in Chemistry
Thomas Summers West (1927–2010), British analytical chemist
Peter Jaffrey Wheatley (1921–1997)
Chaim Weizmann (1874–1952), Russian chemist, developed the ABE-process
George M. Whitesides (born 1939), American chemist
John Rex Whinfield (1901–1966), British chemist, discovered polyester fibres
Otto Wichterle (1913-1998), Czech chemist, known for inventing modern contact lenses
Heinrich Otto Wieland (1877–1957), German chemist 1927 Nobel Prize in Chemistry
Julius Wilbrand (1839–1906), inventor of TNT
Harvey W. Wiley (1844–1930), American chemist, pure food and drug advocate
Sir Geoffrey Wilkinson (1921–1996), 1973 Nobel Prize in Chemistry
Alexander William Williamson (1824–1904), English chemist, famous for Williamson ether synthesis
Thomas Willson (1860–1915), Canadian chemist, discovered an economically efficient process for creating calcium carbide
Richard Willstätter (1872–1942), 1915 Nobel Prize in Chemistry
Adolf Otto Reinhold Windaus (1876–1959), 1928 Nobel Prize in Chemistry
Günter Wirths (1911–2005), German chemist
Georg Wittig (1897–1987), 1979 Nobel Prize in Chemistry
Friedrich Wöhler (1800–1882), German chemist, best known for his synthesis of urea
William Hyde Wollaston (1766–1828), English chemist, discovered the elements palladium and rhodium
Robert B. Woodward (1917–1979), 1965 Nobel Prize in Chemistry
Charles de Worms (1903–1979)
Charles-Adolphe Wurtz (1817–1884), Alsatian French chemist, discovered the Wurtz reaction
Kurt Wüthrich (born 1938), 2002 Nobel Prize in Chemistry

X

Xiaoliang Sunney Xie (born 1962), chemist at Harvard University. A pioneer in the field of Single Molecule Microscopy and CARS (Coherent Anti-Stokes Raman Spectroscopy) microscopy
Xie Yi (born 1967), Chinese chemist, member of the Chinese Academy of Sciences and a fellow of the Royal Society of Chemistry.

Y

Ada Yonath (born 1939), 2006/7 Wolf Prize in Chemistry, 2009 Nobel Prize in Chemistry
Sabir Yunusov (1909–1995), Soviet chemist (alkaloids)

Z

Richard Zare (born 1939), 2005 Wolf Prize in Chemistry
Nikolay Zelinsky (1861–1953), Russian and Soviet Organic chemist, inventor of the first effective gas mask (1915)
Ahmed H. Zewail (1946–2016), Egyptian, 1999 Nobel Prize in Chemistry for his work on femtochemistry
Karl Ziegler (1898–1973), 1963 Nobel Prize in Chemistry
Richard Adolf Zsigmondy (1865–1929), 1925 Nobel Prize in Chemistry

Chemists famous in other areas
Marion Barry (1936–2014), Masters in Organic Chemistry, American politician
Alexander Borodin (1833–1887), Russian chemist and composer
Jerry Buss (1934–2013), PhD in Physical Chemistry, owner of the NBA LA Lakers and other sports franchises
Catherine Coleman (born 1960), American chemist and retired NASA astronaut who went on two Space Shuttle missions
Emmanuel Dongala (born 1941), Congolese chemist and novelist
Elizabeth J. Feinler (born 1931), American information scientist and past director of the Network Information Systems Center at the Stanford Research Institute
Marye Anne Fox (1947–2021), American chemist and university chancellor
Dolph Lundgren (born 1957), Masters in Chemistry, Swedish actor
Primo Levi (1919–1987), resistance fighter, chemist and novelist
Mikhail Lomonosov (1711–1765), Russian chemist, historian, philologist, and poet
Angela Merkel (born 1954), doctorate in quantum chemistry, Chancellor of Germany (2005–2021)
Gaspard Monge (1746–1818), invented descriptive geometry
Francis Muguet (1955–2009), advocate of open information access
Edward W. Morley (1838–1923), performed the Michelson–Morley experiment
Knute Rockne (1888–1931), head football coach of Notre Dame
Elio Di Rupo (born 1951), Prime Minister of Belgium
Israel Shahak (1933–2001)
Margaret Thatcher (1925–2013), Prime Minister of the United Kingdom (1979–1990), research chemist at BX Plastics

See also
 List of biochemists
 List of computational chemists
 List of Russian chemists

References

Lists of natural scientists
Chemistry-related lists